Elizabeth Storrs Mead (née Billings; May 21, 1832 – March 25, 1917) was an American educator who was the 10th President of Mount Holyoke College from 1890 - 1900. She taught at Andover Seminary and Oberlin College, before becoming the first non-alumna president of Mount Holyoke.

Biography
Elizabeth Storrs was born in 1832 in Conway, Massachusetts. She was educated in the common schools and at the seminary of Ipswich, Massachusetts. She received the degrees of M.A. from Oberlin College and L.H.D. from Smith College.

For one year, she taught in the high school of Northampton, Massachusetts. For six years, she conducted a family school with a sister of Andover, Massachusetts. For two years she taught in Oberlin College; and for six years taught at Abbott Seminary of Andover. In 1890–1900, she was president of Mount Holyoke college.

She married Reverend Hiram Mead. They were the parents of social psychologist George Herbert Mead.

She died in Coconut Grove, Miami, Florida on March 25, 1917.

See also
Presidents of Mount Holyoke College

References

Attribution
 

1832 births
1917 deaths
Mount Holyoke College faculty
Presidents and Principals of Mount Holyoke College
Place of death missing
Oberlin College faculty
Women heads of universities and colleges
People from Conway, Massachusetts